Turris aequensis is an extinct species of sea snail, a marine gastropod mollusk in the family Turridae, the turrids.

Description
The length of the  shell attains 26 mm.

Distribution
This extinct marine species was found in Miocene strata in Aquitaine, France.

References

 de Grateloup, J. P. S. "Description d'un genre nouveau de coquille, appele Neritopsis." Actes de la societe Iinneenne de Bordeaus 5 (1832): 125-131.

aequensis
Gastropods described in 1832